Emmanuel Todd (born 16 May 1951) is a French historian, anthropologist, demographer, sociologist and political scientist at the National Institute of Demographic Studies (INED) in Paris. His research examines the different family structures around the world and their relationship with beliefs, ideologies, political systems, and historical events. He has also published a number of political essays, which have received broad coverage in France.

Life and works 
Born in Saint-Germain-en-Laye, Yvelines, Emmanuel Todd is the son of journalist Olivier Todd (fr) and Anne-Marie Nizan. Todd's paternal grandfather, Julius Oblatt, was of Austrian Jewish background, and his paternal grandmother, Helen Todd, was the illegitimate daughter of British magazine editor Dorothy Todd. Emmanuel Todd's maternal grandfather was the writer Paul Nizan. The historian Emmanuel Le Roy Ladurie, who pioneered microhistory, was a friend of the family and gave him his first history book. Aged 10, Todd wanted to become an archeologist. He studied at the Lycée international de Saint-Germain-en-Laye, where he was a member of the Communist Youth. He then studied political science at the Paris Institute of Political Studies and went on to prepare a Ph.D. in history at Trinity College, the University of Cambridge, with Peter Laslett. In 1976 he defended his doctoral thesis on Seven peasant communities in pre-industrial Europe. A comparative study of French, Italian and Swedish rural parishes (18th and early 19th century).

Todd attracted attention in 1976 when, at age 25, he predicted the fall of the Soviet Union, based on indicators such as increasing infant mortality rates:  (The Final Fall: An Essay on the Decomposition of the Soviet Sphere).

He then worked for a time in the literary service of Le Monde daily, then returned to research, working on the hypothesis of a determination of ideologies and religious or political beliefs by familial systems (Explanation of Ideology: Family Structure & Social System, 1983). He then wrote, among other books, The Invention of Europe (1990) and The Fate of Immigrants (1994), in which he defended the "French model" of integration of immigrants.

Todd was opposed to the Maastricht Treaty in the 1992 referendum. In 1995, he wrote a memo for the Fondation Saint-Simon, which became famous — the media thereafter attributed to him the paternity of the expression "" (social crack or social gap), used by Jacques Chirac during the 1995 electoral campaign in order to distinguish himself from his rival Édouard Balladur. Todd, however, has rejected this paternity, and attributed the expression to Marcel Gauchet.

In After the Empire: The Breakdown of the American Order (2001), Todd claims that many indices that he has examined (economic, demographic and ideological) show both that the United States has outlived its status as sole superpower, and that much of the rest of the world is becoming "modern" (declining birth rates etc.) far more rapidly than predicted. Controversially, he proposes that many US foreign policy moves are designed to mask what he sees as the redundancy of the United States. In his analysis, Putin's Russia emerges as probably a more trustworthy partner in today's world than the US. The book has been much read although many of its more original ideas have been received with scepticism.

In spite of his opposition to the Maastricht Treaty in 1992, Todd expressed himself in favour of the Treaty establishing a Constitution for Europe in the referendum of 2005, advocating a protectionist framework at the European level for the future policies of the Union.

In A Convergence of Civilizations: The Transformation of Muslim Societies Around the World  (2007), written with fellow demographist Youssef Courbage, Todd criticized Samuel P. Huntington's thesis of a clash of civilizations, pointing instead to indices of a convergence in styles of life and in values among civilisations.

Throughout much of this time he was working on "The Origins of Family Systems", which he has described as "his life's work". The first volume was published in 2011. He describes how in researching the book he has, over 40 years, "read more anthropology monographs than most anthropologists." He has described the book as "completed", with only the stage of writing up its second and final volume remaining.

His 2015 essay Qui est Charlie? Sociologie d'une crise religieuse ("Who is Charlie? Sociology of a Religious Crisis") became his most controversial and his most popular essay. In the essay, Todd claims that the 11 January 2015 marches to show solidarity with the Charlie Hebdo staff who had been massacred by Muslim terrorists several days before were an expression not of French liberal values but of racist and reactionary currents in French society. The work has been accused by politicians of a seeming willingness to look aside from the reality of Islamist terrorism while some readers accuse it of a reliance on unsupported a priori arguments while failing to consider other, more relevant political factors. The book aroused copious and emotional hostility, including a critique by the Prime Minister of France, Manuel Valls. Todd claims to have written quickly, partly out of frustration and not in a purely academic style, though he defends his arguments' basis in his decades of French demographic research.

Criticism 
 
The claim that the Empire is American is questioned such as by Michael Hardt and Antonio Negri in their Empire. They claim that the origins of the Empire are in Europe, not in the United States, based on the emigration of scientists from Europe to the United States, especially from Austria, during and around the Second World War.

Quotes

In popular culture 
There is an implicit but clear reference to The Final Fall published in 1976, and its author, in Robert Littell's book The Company: A Novel of the CIA, a fiction, but with heavy historical inputs, on the American intelligence agency. In it, two analysts discuss in 1983 forecasts of the Soviet Union when from the outside, it was seen as a solid entity:
"The Soviet Union," one of the independent economists was arguing, "is an Upper Volta with rockets." He waved a pamphlet in the air. "A French analyst has documented this. The number of women who die in childbirth in the Soviet Union has been decreasing since the Bolshevik Revolution. Suddenly, in the early seventies, the statistic bottomed out and then started to get worse each year until the Russians finally grasped how revealing this statistic was and stopped reporting it." — "What in God's name does a statistic about the number of women who die in childbirth have to do with analyzing Soviet military spending?" a Company analyst snarled across the table. — "If you people knew how to interpret statistics, you'd know that everything is related—"

Books

With an English translation
 The Final Fall: An Essay on the Decomposition of the Soviet Sphere, 1979, Karz Publishers, translated by John Waggoner (La chute finale: Essai sur la décomposition de la sphère Soviétique, 1976)
 The Explanation of Ideology: Family Structure & Social Systems, 1985, Blackwell Publishers, translated by David Garrioch (La Troisième planète, 1983)
 The Causes of Progress: Culture, Authority, and Change, 1987, Blackwell Publishers, translated by  Richard Boulind (L'enfance du monde, 1984)
 The Making of Modern France: Ideology, Politics and Culture, 1991, Blackwell Publishers, translated by Anthony C. Forster (La Nouvelle France, 1988)
 After the Empire: The Breakdown of the American Order, 2003, Columbia University Press, translated by Christopher Jon Delogu, foreword by Michael Lind (Après l’Empire : Essai sur la décomposition du système américain, 2001)
 A Convergence of Civilizations: The Transformation of Muslim Societies Around the World with Youssef Courbage, 2007, Columbia University Press, translated by George Holoch (Le Rendez-vous des civilisations, 2007)
 Who is Charlie? Xenophobia and the New Middle Class, 2015, Polity Press, translated by Andrew Brown (Qui est Charlie? Sociologie d'une crise religieuse, 2015)
 Lineages of Modernity: A History of Humanity from the Stone Age to Homo Americanus, 2019, Polity Press (Où en sommes-nous ? Une esquisse de l'histoire humaine, 2017)

Without an English translation
 The Fool And The Proletariat (Le Fou et le Prolétaire), Éditions Robert Laffont, Paris, 1979.  On the pre-1914 elites of Europe, which led to World War I and totalitarianism.  
 The Invention Of France (L'Invention de la France), with Hervé Le Bras (fr), Éditions Pluriel-Hachettes, Paris, 1981. 
 The Invention of Europe (L'invention de l'Europe), coll. « L'Histoire immédiate », 1990. 
 The Fate [Destiny] of Immigrants (Le destin des immigrés), Paris, Éditions Le Seuil, 1994. 
 The Economic Illusion:  Essay on the stagnation of developed societies (L'illusion économique. Essai sur la stagnation des sociétés développées), Paris, Éditions Gallimard, 1998. 
 The Diversity Of The World:  Family and Modernity (La Diversité du monde : Famille et modernité), Éditions Le Seuil, coll. « L'histoire immédiate », Paris, 1999.
 After Democracy (Après la démocratie), Paris, Éditions Gallimard, 2008.
 Allah is not to blame! (Allah n'y est pour rien !), Paris, Éditions Le Publieur, coll. arretsurimages.net, 2011. 
 The Origin Of Family Systems, Volume One:  Eurasia (L'origine des systèmes familiaux, Tome 1: L'Eurasie), Paris, Éditions Gallimard, 2011, of which the translated introduction is already available online.
 The French Mystery (Le mystère français), with Hervé Le Bras (fr), Paris, Éditions Le Seuil, coll. « La République des idées », 2013.

Footnotes

External links

Charlie Rose, interview of Emmanuel Todd - April 29, 2003
Interview with Emmanuel Todd on 'After the Empire', by Michael Monninger Prospect Magazine - June 20, 2003 
"The Conceited Empire", interview with Martin A. Senn & Felix Lautenschlager for The New Zuricher - July 26, 2003
"Emmanuel Todd: The Specter of a Soviet-Style Crisis" translation of an interview with Le Figaro by Marie-Laure Germon and Alexis Lacroix - September 12, 2005
Emmanuel Todd interview on the 'French riots' translation of an interview with Le Monde by Raphaëlle Bacqué, Jean-Michel Dumay and Sophie Gherardi - November 29, 2005
Protectionism and Democracy, Interview with Emmanuel Todd, by Karim Emile Bitar (French), published in L'ENA hors les murs, the ENA alumni magazine - July 12, 2009
« @ux sources d'Emmanuel Todd - Quelles sont les sources d'un prophète ? » (in French), Arrêt sur images - February 24, 2012
Interview with Oliver Berruyer, Germany’s Fast Hold on the European Continent - September 1, 2014
Emmanuel Todd on Brexit, interview with Atlantico.fr, translated by Anne-Marie de Grazia, July 3, 2016
Emmanuel Todd: "Trump was speaking the truth about state of U.S. society" - November 18, 2016
‘World War 3 has already started’ between US and Russia/China, argues French scholar - 2023 Interview

1951 births
20th-century French historians
21st-century French historians
Alumni of Trinity College, Cambridge
French anthropologists
French demographers
French male non-fiction writers
French people of Austrian-Jewish descent
French political scientists
French sociologists
Living people
People from Saint-Germain-en-Laye
Sciences Po alumni